Nikolai Dmitriyevich Kondratiev (also Kondratieff; Russian: Никола́й Дми́триевич Кондра́тьев; 4 March 1892 – 17 September 1938) was a Russian Soviet economist and proponent of the New Economic Policy (NEP) best known for the business cycle theory known as Kondratiev waves.

Kondratiev became an early leading figure of Soviet economics and promoted the NEP's system of small private free market enterprises in the Soviet Union. Kondratiev's theory that Western capitalist economies have long term (50-to-60-year) cycles of boom followed by depression gained recognition inside and outside the Soviet Union.

Kondratiev was condemned and imprisoned in 1930 but continued to publish works until his execution during the Great Purge in 1938.

Life

Early life and education
Nikolai Dimitrievich Kondratiev was born on 4 March 1892 in the Galuevskaya, a village near Vichuga, Kostroma Governorate, into a peasant family of Komi heritage. Kondratiev was tutored at the University of St. Petersburg before the 1917 Russian Revolution by Mikhail Tugan-Baranovsky and Alexander Sergeyevich Lappo-Danilevsky. A member of the Socialist-Revolutionary Party, his initial professional work was in the area of agricultural economics and statistics and the problem of food supplies. On 5 October 1917, at the age of 25, he was appointed Deputy Minister of Supply of the last Alexander Kerensky government, which lasted for only a few days.

After the revolution, Kondratiev pursued academic research. In 1919, he was appointed to a teaching post at the Agricultural Academy of Peter the Great. In October 1920 he founded the Institute of Conjuncture, in Moscow. As its first director, he developed it into a large and respected institution with 51 researchers by 1923.

In 1922, he published his first writing on long cycles., The World Economy and its Conjunctures During and After the War. To provide proof that capitalist economies were subject to spontaneous and recurrent depressions and recoveries, Kondratiev did extensive price analysis of goods in the German, British, and French economies. Among the prices studied were raw materials and output products, interest rates, foreign trade, wages, and bank deposits.

In 1923, Kondratiev intervened in the debate about the "Scissors Crisis", following the general opinion of his colleagues.  In 1923–25, he worked on a five-year plan for the development of Soviet agriculture. In 1924, after publishing his first book, presenting the first tentative version of his theory of major cycles, Kondratiev traveled to England, Germany, Canada and the United States, and visited several universities before returning to Russia..

In Kondratiev’s Paper on the Notion of Economic Statics, Dynamics and Fluctuations, published in 1924, Kondratiev’s conclusions were as follows.
1.	Prosperity years were most common in the capitalist economies during upswing periods.
2.	Agriculture suffered more and long depressions than did industry during price downswings
3.	Major technological innovations were conceived in downswing periods but were developed in upswing periods
4.	Gold supply increased, and new markets were opened at the beginning of an upswing
5.	The most extensive and devastating wars occurred during periods of an upswing(Mager, 1987, p. 27)

These conclusions showed that capitalism was sustainable, to the disdain of Communist officials. This was a primary reason for his execution in 1938.

In 1925 he published his book The Major Economic Cycles, which quickly was translated into German. A short form was published in 1935 in the Review of Economic Statistics and for a time his ideas became popular in the West, until eclipsed by those of John Maynard Keynes.

Kondratiev's economic cycle theory held that there were long cycles of about fifty years. At the beginning of the cycle economies produce high-cost capital goods and infrastructure investments creating new employment and income and demand for consumer goods. However, after a few decades the expected return on investment falls below the interest rate and people refuse to invest, even as overcapacity in capital goods gives rise to massive layoffs, reducing the demand for consumer goods. Unemployment and a long economic crisis ensue as economies contract. People and companies save their resources until confidence begins to return and there is an upswing into a new capital formation period, usually characterized by large scale investment in new technologies.

Famous Austrian economist, Joseph Schumpeter credited the foundations of Long Wave Theory to Nikolai Kondratiev. He coined the term "Kondratiev Waves" (K-waves) in respect for Nikolai Kondratiev.

Support of the People's Commissariat

A member of the People's Commissariat of Agriculture and a proponent of the Soviet New Economic Policy (NEP) supported by Vladimir Lenin, Kondratiev was influential with writings about agriculture and planning methodology. Influenced by his trips overseas, he advocated a market-led industrialization strategy emphasizing export of agricultural produce to pay for industrialization, following the Ricardian economics theory of comparative advantage. He proposed a plan for agriculture and forestry from 1924 to 1928. However, after the death of Lenin in 1924, Joseph Stalin, who favored complete government control of the economy, took control of the Communist Party. Kondratiev's influence quickly waned.

According to the late Harvard sociologist Carle C. Zimmerman, Kondratiev was reported to Soviet authorities by a member of the University of Minnesota agriculture faculty in 1927 after a visit to sociologist Pitirim Sorokin, a fellow Komi:

Kondratieff (sic), an agricultural economist and student of business cycles, visited Minnesota in 1927 and stayed with Sorokin. A number of prominent American scientists were pro-communist at the time. One was a forester at the Ag campus where I had an office. He upbraided me for associating with Sorokin and Kondratieff and told me he was going to send a report about Kondratieff back to Russia. Later I learned that Kondratieff was arrested immediately after returning to Russia from the trip to see American universities. However, he was not given the final "treatment" until the Stalinist purges of 1931.

Fall from USSR directorship

Kondratiev was removed from the directorship of the Institute of Conjuncture in 1928 and arrested in July 1930, accused of being a member of a "" (a non-existent party invented by the NKVD). Convicted as a "kulak-professor" and sentenced to 8 years in prison, Kondratiev served his sentence, from February 1932 onwards, at Suzdal, near Moscow. Although his health deteriorated under poor conditions, Kondratiev continued his research and decided to prepare five new books, as he mentioned in a letter to his wife. Some of these texts were indeed completed and were published.

His last letter was sent to his daughter, Elena Kondratieva, on 31 August 1938. In September 1938 during Stalin's Great Purge, he was subjected to a second trial, condemned to ten years without the right to correspond with the outside world. However, Kondratiev was executed at the Kommunarka shooting ground by firing squad on the same day the sentence was issued. Kondratiev was 46 at the time of his execution.

Legacy
In the 1970s, increased interest in business cycles led to the rediscovery of Kondratiev's work, including the first-time publication of a complete English translation of his seminal article "The Long Waves in Economic Life" in the journal Review (Fernand Braudel Center) in 1979 (the article was originally published in a German journal in 1926 and a partial English translation appeared in the journal The Review of Economic Statistics in 1935).  This rediscovery of Kondratiev in English-speaking academia led to his theories being extended for the first time beyond economics as, for example, political scientists such as Joshua Goldstein and geographers such as Brian Berry extended the concept of Kondratiev long waves into their own fields.  However, Kondratiev's theory remains controversial because, among other issues, of his ideas about the periodical character of the replacement of basic capital goods and the empirical possibility of coincidence in identifying long waves (i.e. that long waves are simply an epiphenomenon). Economists disagree about the length of cycles and their starting or ending points.

In 1987, the Soviet Union officially rehabilitated Kondratiev. His collected works were first translated into English by Stephen S. Wilson in 1998. In 1992, on the centenary of his birth, the International Foundation N.A. Kondratiev was founded at the hands of Russian academics, Elena Kondratieva and Italian economist Giancarlo Pallavicini, at the time the first Western advisor to the Russian government for the reform of the economy, appointed vice president, along with Yurji Jacovetz, and Leonid Abalkin president

Major works
 1922 – The Grain Market
 1922 – The World Economy and its Conjunctures During and After the War
 1923 – "Some Controversial Questions Concerning the World Economy and Crisis (Answer to Our Critiques)"
 1924 – "On the Notion of Economic Statics, Dynamics and Fluctuations"
 1925 – The Major Economic Cycles
 English version 
 1926a – "About the Question of the Major Cycles of the Conjuncture"
 1926b – "Problems of Forecasting"
 1926c – "Die langen Wellen der Konjunktur" (translated into English as "The Long Waves in Economic Life" in 1935/1979)
 1928a – The Major Cycles of the Conjuncture
 1928b – "Dynamics of Industrial and Agricultural Prices (Contribution to the Theory of Relative Dynamics and Conjuncture)"
 1934 – "Main Problems of Economic Statics and Dynamics"

See also
 Kondratiev wave
 World-systems approach
 Eugen Slutsky
 Information Revolution

References

Further reading
 
 Barnett, Vincent L. Kondratiev and the Dynamics of Economic Development: Long Cycles and Industrial Growth in Historical Context. London: Macmillan Publishing, 1998.
 Barnett, Vincent L.; Warren J. Samuels; Natalia Makashava, editors, Translated by Stephen S. Wilson, Collected Works of Nikolai Kondratiev. In four volumes. London: Pickering and Catto, 1998.
 Grinin, L., Korotayev, A. and Tausch A. (2016) Economic Cycles, Crises, and the Global Periphery. Springer International Publishing, Heidelberg, New York, Dordrecht, London, ; 
 
 
 Korotayev, Andrey V., & Tsirel, Sergey V.(2010). A Spectral Analysis of World GDP Dynamics: Kondratiev Waves, Kuznets Swings, Juglar and Kitchin Cycles in Global Economic Development, and the 2008–2009 Economic Crisis. Structure and Dynamics. Vol.4. No. 1. P.3-57
 Weekes, Frederic. Kondratiev: Pioneer of the Business Cycle. iUniverse, 2012.
 Yakovets, Yuri. "The Heritage of Nikolai Kondratieff: a View From the 21st Century," Comparative Civilizations Review, University of Michigan, 2007.
 Béla Sipos (economist):„Empirical research of long-term cycles”. STATISZTIKAI SZEMLE [Statistical Survey] 75: 1. ksz. pp. 119-128., Bp.,1997. 
Béla Sipos (economist): „Analysis of long-term tendencies in the world economy and Hungary”. STATISZTIKAI SZEMLE [Statistical Survey] 80: Klnsz pp. 86-102. 2002.

External links
 Kondratiev wave website  – by Gunter Krumme, University of Washington
 Kondratieff Waves almanac

1892 births
1938 deaths
People from Ivanovo Oblast
People from Kineshemsky Uyezd
Socialist Revolutionary Party politicians
Russian Constituent Assembly members
Marxian economists
Socialist economists
Russian Marxists
Fellows of the Econometric Society
Great Purge victims from Russia
People executed by the Soviet Union by firing squad
Soviet rehabilitations